Visakhapatnam BRTS :-The implementation of the bus rapid transit system has been taken up as a high- capacity public transport system in Visakhapatnam keeping in view the projected multi-fold increase in traffic and constraints of road capacity.
A Bus Rapid Transit System (BRTS) was approved for the city under the JNNURM.
This project is under construction and will be completed by the end of 2010.
The BRTS intends to increase use of public transport from the present share of about 30 per cent to 50 per cent by 2011.

Corridors 

The following two corridors were identified for BRTS by the APSRTC and Greater Visakhapatnam Municipal Corporation.

The two corridors connect Pendurthi to Dwaraka Nagar on two different routes. Vizag BRTS - Pendurthy Transit Corridor. Pendurthi via Gopalapatnam, NAD X Road, Kancharapalem and the Railway Station. Vizag BRTS - Simhachalam Transit Corridor. Pendurthi via Simhachalam, Adavivaram, Hanumanthavaka and Maddilapalem.

Bus Rapid Transport System projects of about 42 km in Vizag city at a total cost of about Rs 452 crore. The BRTS would be implemented with a joint finance from the Andhra Pradesh government (20 %) and Government of India (50 %) under JNNURM, and GVMC (30 %).

Bus rapid transit in India
Transport in Visakhapatnam